Culver CityBus is a public transport agency operating in Culver City, California, currently serving Culver City, the unincorporated community of Marina del Rey, and the adjacent Los Angeles neighborhoods.

Its regular fleet is painted bright green and its rapid fleet primarily a chrome gray, distinguishing it from Santa Monica's Big Blue Bus, orange-colored Metro Local buses, and red-colored Metro Rapid buses, whose coverage areas overlap on Los Angeles's Westside.

History 
Culver CityBus was founded on 3 March 1928, making it the second oldest municipal bus line in California and the oldest public transit bus system still operating in Los Angeles County. Big Blue Bus was founded on 14 April 1928, the San Francisco Municipal Railway began streetcar service 28 December 1912.

Service area 
Within its service area of around 25.5 square miles, the Culver CityBus provides service to the communities of:
 Venice
 Westchester
 Westwood
 West Los Angeles
 Palms
 Playa Vista
 Marina del Rey
 Mar Vista
 Century City
 Culver City

Routes 
Culver CityBus operates 3 daily routes, 3 weekday-only routes, and 2 Monday-Saturday routes within Los Angeles County.  Among its 3 weekday-only routes, Culver CityBus operates a Rapid route (Rapid 6).

 # Weekend service is provided on New Year's Day, Memorial Day, Independence Day, Labor Day, Thanksgiving Day and Christmas Day.

Current fleet

Notes 
Culver CityBus currently operates an all New Flyer fleet of 54 buses. All buses run on CNG. Culver CityBus has retired its old fleet, mostly made of buses by Flxible, TMC/RTS, and Gillig.

Culver CityBus is beginning to retire its C40LF fleet from 2001 and 2004. New XN40 buses were delivered in 2017, and are currently in service.

All buses are numbered 70—and 71--.

The buses were originally painted green and white, but all buses were repainted to all green in 2000.

In 2008, large decals honoring Culver CityBus's 80th year of service were affixed to buses. They were later removed in 2009.

Culver CityBus began operating six New Flyer C40LFR buses on the new Rapid 6 starting on 4 January 2010.

Rapid Buses are painted primarily a chrome gray to distinguish themselves from the regular bright green buses.

In 2012, Culver CityBus took delivery of 20 New Flyer Xcelsior XN40 buses and started operating some of them beginning in late May 2012 with the rest to be phased in by late June.

References

External links 
 Culver City Bus

Transportation in Culver City, California
Public transportation in Los Angeles County, California
Bus rapid transit in California
Bus transportation in California
Public transportation in Los Angeles
Marina del Rey, California
Transit authorities with natural gas buses
Transit agencies in California
1928 establishments in California